Good Shepherd Sunday is the day on which the Gospel passage of the Good Shepherd is read during the liturgies of certain Christian denominations. This may be the:

 Third Sunday of Easter, the traditional Good Shepherd Sunday
 Fourth Sunday of Easter, the day to which many Christian denominations assigned the reading after the liturgical reforms of the 1970s

Christian Sunday observances
Eastertide